Ethopia roseilinea is a species of snout moth in the genus Ethopia. It was described by Francis Walker in 1865 and is known from New Guinea, Papua New Guinea, the Philippines, Sri Lanka and the D'Entrecasteaux Islands.

References

Moths described in 1865
Tirathabini